Getting Married (Swedish: Giftas) is a 1955 Swedish drama film directed by Anders Henrikson and starring Anita Björk, Elsa Carlsson and Edvin Adolphson. It was shot at the Sundbyberg Studios of Europa Film in Stockholm. The film's sets were designed by the art director Arne Åkermark. It is based on the short story collection Getting Married by August Strindberg. It is also known by the alternative title Of Love and Lust, the name under which it was given on its 1959 United States release alongside A Doll's House.

Cast
 Anita Björk as Helene
 Anders Henrikson as 	Albert Sund
 Elsa Carlsson as 	Emilia
 Edvin Adolphson as 	Gen. Jakob
 Gerda Lundequist as 	Her Royal Highness
 Herman Ahlsell as 	Lieutenant 
 Ragnar Arvedson as Lieutenant Colonel 
 Renée Björling as 	Woman on carriage 
 Astrid Bodin as 	Lova, housemaid 
 Artur Cederborgh as 	Johansson 
 Gösta Cederlund as 	Colonel 
 Nancy Dalunde as 	Aunt Emilia's guest 
 Märta Dorff as 	Aunt Emilia's guest 
 Edvin Fredrikson as Teacher 
 Leif Hedenberg as 	Lieutenant 
 Olle Hilding as 	Farm hand 
 Linnéa Hillberg as 	Malin 
 Inger Juel as 	Professor's wife 
 Holger Löwenadler as 	Docent 
 Curt Löwgren as 	Groom 
 Ellika Mann as 	Girl at the ball 
 Gull Natorp as 	Colonel's wife 
 Tommy Nilson as 	Cavalryman 
 Ingemar Pallin as 	Lieutenant 
 Emy Storm as 	Maid 
 Håkan Westergren as 	Docent 
 Carl-Gunnar Wingård as 	Docent 
 Signe Wirff as 	Aunt Emilia's guest

References

Bibliography 
 Qvist, Per Olov & von Bagh, Peter. Guide to the Cinema of Sweden and Finland. Greenwood Publishing Group, 2000.

External links 
 

1955 films
Swedish drama films
1955 drama films
1950s Swedish-language films
Films directed by Anders Henrikson
Films based on works by August Strindberg
Films based on short fiction
Swedish black-and-white films
1950s Swedish films